"The Clown" is a song written by Wayne Carson, Brenda Barnett, Charlie Chalmers and Sandra Rhodes, and recorded by American country music artist Conway Twitty.  It was released in December 1981 as the first single from the album Southern Comfort.  The song was Twitty's 28th number one hit on the country chart.  The single went to number one for one week and spent a total of 13 weeks on the country chart.

Charts

Weekly charts

Year-end charts

References
 

1982 singles
1981 songs
Conway Twitty songs
Songs written by Wayne Carson
Song recordings produced by Jimmy Bowen
Elektra Records singles